Frederick William Fisher (11 April 1910 – 26 July 1944) was an English professional football forward who played in the Football League for Barnsley, Chesterfield and Millwall. He won a wartime international cap for England in a 4–1 victory over Wales on 16 April 1941.

Military service and death 
Fisher was married and served as an air gunner with the rank of sergeant in the Royal Air Force Volunteer Reserve during the Second World War. On 25 July 1944, Fisher took off from RAF Kirmington in an Avro Lancaster piloted by Flying Officer Bernard Singleton to conduct a raid on Stuttgart, along with another 412 Lancasters and 138 Hailfaxes. Over Yonne, German-occupied France, Fisher's Lancaster was intercepted by a German Junkers Ju 88 night fighter, and it was shot down over Saint-Sauveur-en-Puisaye. The night fighter pilot is thought to have been Oberleutnant Herbert Schulte zur Surlage, who was forced to bail out of his Ju 88 after taking return fire from Fisher's Lancaster. All seven on board, including Fisher, were killed when the plane crashed near Taingy. He was buried in Taingy Communal Cemetery.

Career statistics

References

English footballers
English Football League players
Association football forwards
1910 births
1944 deaths
Footballers from Barnsley
Association football outside forwards
Association football inside forwards
Monckton Athletic F.C. players
Barnsley F.C. players
Chesterfield F.C. players
Millwall F.C. players
England wartime international footballers
Royal Air Force Volunteer Reserve personnel of World War II
Royal Air Force personnel killed in World War II
Victims of aviation accidents or incidents in France
Victims of aviation accidents or incidents in 1944
Royal Air Force airmen